Sheila C. Nelson (born April 25, 1958) is an American politician from Georgia. Nelson is a Democrat member of Georgia House of Representatives for District 125. The district includes parts of the city of Augusta.

References

Democratic Party members of the Georgia House of Representatives
21st-century American politicians
Living people
21st-century American women politicians
Women state legislators in Georgia (U.S. state)
1958 births